Mundos Opuestos is a Colombian reality show that is produced and broadcast by RCN TV. It is based on the Chilean hit show of the same

18 participants, 9 of them famous, live and compete together, but are separated in two different worlds. Some will have the comfort and technology of the future life, while others will have to live like our ancestors did 100 years ago, all for the prize of $400 million Colombian pesos, about $200,000 US dollars.

The premise of the competition is that participants are divided into two groups, one living "the life of the future" and other "past life". The two worlds present in the house are separated by a glass wall, allowing both groups to observe the actions of the other, the direct interaction between the two groups of participants is given in the courtyard, known as "the present." Participants of the two existing groups compete each week in various physical tests to determine which group will live in the past and which in the future and determine the participant to be eliminated from the competition.

Rules 
 " 'Protected for all time" is the only participant who has immunity, and does not run the risk of being eliminated or nominated, you can move freely throughout the past, present and future, but cannot deliver goods to both the future participants of the past, and past participants of the future. It has the blue suit to differentiate it from the other participants, and is the only one who decides who will be the nominee of the council of past and future in case there is a tie.
 "'' 'Punished for all time": The participant was the fewest votes from the public via text messages, becoming the nominee extra.
 " 'This'": The place where all participants can move, but no participant may circulate in the present before 10:00 am nor after midnight.
 " ''' Secret room'": It is located in the world of the future and delivers additional conveniences and surprises the competitors of the winning team and those who have beaten the "Wellness Challenge" of the week. Also, the room allows this couple can communicate via video with a family member or close.

References

External links
 - 

Colombian television series